Cruel Winter Blues (lit. "A Hot-blooded Man") is a 2006 South Korean film written and directed by Lee Jeong-beom. It stars Sol Kyung-gu, Jo Han-sun and Na Moon-hee in the lead roles. The narrative centers around a small-time crook who partners with a retired taekwondo practitioner to seek revenge on the man who killed his mentor, and ends up befriending the killer's mother who reminds him of his hometown.

The film released on 9 November 2006.

Synopsis
A mob captain, Jae-mun (Sol Kyung-gu) is the seasoned veteran of a mob family. He decides to go after rival mobster Dae-sik, the man who killed his boss and childhood friend a few years earlier. He takes Chi-guk with him as his partner in the assassination. Although a physically imposing black belt in taekwondo, Chi-guk (Jo Han-sun) is a soft-spoken newcomer to gang life, who is quietly offended by Jae-mun's arbitrary and random acts of cruelty and rudeness against him and others. Together, they travel to Dae-sik's hometown, a remote rural village called Bulgyo in South Jeolla Province.

While waiting for an opportunity to perform the hit, Jae-mun coincidentally befriends Dae-sik's mother Jeon-sim (Na Moon-hee) and spends some time with her. She comes to lovingly treat him as another son, and Jae-mun begins to feel conflicted. A tragic plot develops, culminating in a bloody showdown between Jae-mun and Dae-sik.

Cast
 Jo Han-sun as Chi-guk
 Sol Kyung-gu as Jae-mun
 Na Moon-hee as Jeon-sim
 Kim Kwak-kyung-hee as Flat woman

Awards and nominations
2006 Women in Film Korea Awards 
 Best Actress - Na Moon-hee

2007 Baeksang Arts Awards
 Nomination - Best Actress - Na Moon-hee
 Nomination - Best New Director - Lee Jeong-beom

2007 Chunsa Film Art Awards
 Best Supporting Actor -  Jo Han-sun

2007 Blue Dragon Film Awards
 Best Supporting Actress - Na Moon-hee 
 Nomination - Best Supporting Actor -  Jo Han-sun
 Nomination - Best New Director - Lee Jeong-beom

2007 Korean Film Awards
 Nomination - Best Actor - Sol Kyung-gu
 Nomination - Best Supporting Actor -  Jo Han-sun
 Nomination - Best New Director - Lee Jeong-beom

References

External links 
 http://www.hotblood.co.kr/ 
 
 
 

2006 films
2000s crime drama films
South Korean crime drama films
South Korean neo-noir films
Films about organized crime in South Korea
Films directed by Lee Jeong-beom
2000s Korean-language films
CJ Entertainment films
2006 directorial debut films
2006 drama films
2000s South Korean films